This is a list of defunct airlines of Colombia.

See also
List of airlines of Colombia
List of airports in Colombia

References

Colombia
Airlines
Airlines, defunct